Alexandre "Álex" Moreno Lopera (born 8 June 1993) is a Spanish professional footballer who plays for  club Aston Villa as a left-back or left winger.

He spent most of his career with Rayo Vallecano and Betis, achieving La Liga totals of 146 games and six goals over six seasons and winning the 2021–22 Copa del Rey with the latter club. In January 2023, he signed with Aston Villa. 

Moreno represented the Catalonia national side, making his debut in May 2022.

Club career

Early years and Mallorca
Born in Sant Sadurní d'Anoia, Barcelona, Catalonia, Moreno graduated from local FC Vilafranca's academy, making his senior debut in 2010–11 in the Tercera División. He signed with FC Barcelona in April 2011, being assigned to the youth side; he started his career as a winger.

In July 2012, Moreno joined Segunda División B club UE Llagostera. He finished the campaign with 1,333 minutes of action, scoring twice.

On 4 July 2013, Moreno moved to RCD Mallorca, recently relegated to the second division. He played his first professional match on 18 August, in a 4–0 away loss against CE Sabadell FC in the Segunda División.

Moreno scored his first goal in division two on 4 January 2014, the last in a 2–2 draw at UD Las Palmas. He featured regularly during the season, as his team narrowly avoided another drop.

Rayo Vallecano
On 15 July 2014, Moreno signed a four-year deal with Rayo Vallecano. He made his La Liga debut on 14 September, coming on as a late substitute in a 2–3 home defeat against Elche CF.

Moreno was loaned to Elche of the second tier for one year on 13 August 2015. He was an undisputed starter after returning to the Campo de Fútbol de Vallecas, netting three times from 40 appearances in 2017–18 as the side returned to the top flight as champions.

Betis
On 21 August 2019, after suffering relegation, Moreno joined Real Betis on a five-year contract. He scored his first goal for the Andalusians the following 11 January, in the 3–0 win over Club Portugalete in the second round of the Copa del Rey. His first in the league came on 24 October 2021, helping the hosts to beat Rayo Vallecano 3–2. He added a brace on 12 December, in a 4–0 defeat of Real Sociedad also at the Estadio Benito Villamarín.

Moreno made eight appearances in the 2021–22 Spanish Cup, as they won the tournament for the third time in their history; this included 105 minutes of the final against Valencia CF, won on penalties in Seville.

Aston Villa
On 11 January 2023, Moreno joined Premier League club Aston Villa for an undisclosed fee, signing a three-and-a-half-year deal; he was given the number 15 shirt. He made his league debut two days later, replacing the injured Lucas Digne early into an eventual 2–1 home win over Leeds United.

International career
Moreno made his debut for the non-FIFA Catalonia side on 25 May 2022, starting in a 6–0 win over Jamaica.

Career statistics

Club

Honours
Rayo Vallecano
Segunda División: 2017–18

Betis
Copa del Rey: 2021–22

Notes

References

External links
Aston Villa official profile

1993 births
Living people
People from Alt Penedès
Sportspeople from the Province of Barcelona
Spanish footballers
Footballers from Catalonia
Association football defenders
Association football wingers
La Liga players
Segunda División players
Segunda División B players
Tercera División players
UE Costa Brava players
RCD Mallorca players
RCD Mallorca B players
Rayo Vallecano players
Elche CF players
Real Betis players
Premier League players
Aston Villa F.C. players
Catalonia international footballers
Spanish expatriate footballers
Expatriate footballers in England
Spanish expatriate sportspeople in England